WMGW (1490 AM) is a commercial radio station in Meadville, Pennsylvania, the seat of government for Crawford County.  WMGW is the flagship station of the "Allegheny News-Talk-Sports Network," also owned by its licensee, Seven Mountains Media.

Programming is simulcast on two other Forever Broadcasting stations, WTIV 1230 AM in Titusville and WFRA 1450 AM in Franklin.  WMGW is also heard on 250-watt FM translator W264DK at 100.7 MHz.

Programming
On weekdays, WMGW, WTIV and WFRA begin with "Daybreak News" and "The Morning Drill," two programs with local news, weather and information.  The rest of the weekday schedule is made up of nationally syndicated talk shows, including Glenn Beck, Clay Travis and Buck Sexton, Sean Hannity, Mark Levin, Dave Ramsey, Jim Bohannon, Coast to Coast AM with George Noory and America in the Morning.

Weekends feature shows on home repair, gardening and repeats of weekday shows.  Syndicated weekend programming include Sunday Night Live with Bill Cunningham Somewhere in Time with Art Bell and sports updates from Fox Sports Radio.  On Sunday mornings, Christian radio shows are heard.  World and national news is supplied by Fox News Radio.

History

Early years
WMGW signed on the air in 1947, as the first radio station in Crawford County.  It was founded by Meadville physician Dr. Harry C. Winslow.  Dr. Winslow chose his daughter's initials (Mary Grace Winslow) for the station's call letters.  A year after WMGW's founding, an FM station was added at 100.3, WMGW-FM.  For the first three decades, WMGW and WMGW-FM mostly simulcast their programming.

Like many small-town radio stations, WMGW-AM-FM broadcast a full service radio format through the 1960s, 70s and 80s, consisting of local, world and national news, local and Pittsburgh sports, and adult contemporary music.  World and national news was provided by ABC News and the Associated Press radio network.

In the early 1970s, WMGW-AM-FM were purchased by the Regional Broadcasters Group headquartered in Kingston, New York.  The FM station's call letters were changed to WZPR as a tribute to Meadville's Talon Corporation which, nearly a century earlier, had become America's first manufacturer of "hookless fasteners" or zippers.  While WMGW's format remained the same, WZPR changed to automated beautiful music, and in 1978 it switched to its current format, country music, eventually taking the WGYY call letters.

Changes in ownership
WMGW was purchased by Great Circle Broadcasting in 1983, a division of the now-defunct Music Broadcasting Group.  Approximately five years prior to the purchase, the studios and offices of both stations had moved from their second floor location on Park Avenue to the Downtown Mall on Water Street in Meadville, allowing shoppers to see a glimpse of the stations at work.  The station remains in this location today.

In 1999, Music Broadcasting began negotiations to sell WMGW and its FM sister station WZPR, to Altoona, Pennsylvania-based Forever Broadcasting, which had been looking to gain a foothold in Northwest Pennsylvania.  Forever Broadcasting acquired both stations the following year for an undisclosed price.

Switch to Talk and Sports
By the 1990s, most listeners were tuning to FM stations for music.  WMGW gradually eliminated its music programming.  In 199, WMGW switched to a format of all news, talk, and sports.  It formed the Allegheny News Talk Sports Network, along with two other AM stations owned by Forever Broadcasting.  The network consists of a "trimulcast" outside of morning drive, with all stations sharing the same programming after 9 a.m.  Sports broadcasts include Pittsburgh Pirates baseball, and the NFL on Westwood One.  (Prior to December 2009, WOYL in Oil City had also been a part of this network, in effect making it a quadcast. WOYL permanently ceased operations in July 2010.)

In morning drive, the trimulcast is broken down into a simulcast, with WMGW and WTIV airing a morning show independent of WFRA, which airs its own separate live morning show program with programming matter exclusive to its immediate local market.  The full-time operations of the network and its respective stations originate out of the Downtown Mall location, but WFRA maintains a separate office and studio in WFRA's city of license in Franklin, Pennsylvania.  Keith Allen Austin (real name: Keith Amolsch) hosted the morning show for WMGW and WTIV until his death on June 8, 2014, following a brief illness.  He was 59.

Allegheny News Talk Sports Network stations
WMGW in Meadville
WTIV in Titusville
WFRA in Franklin

All stations are owned by Forever Broadcasting, LLC

References

External links
 

MGW
Radio stations established in 1947
1947 establishments in Pennsylvania